EBS may refer to:

Broadcasting
 EBS TV (Ethiopia)
 Educational Broadband Service, US TV service
 Educational Broadcasting System, Mass Media Production Company Founded in 2011  
 EBS 1, a South Korean television channel
 Emergency Broadcast System, former US Warning system
 Europe by Satellite, the EU TV information service

Computing
 Amazon Elastic Block Store, a cloud storage system
 Erase Block Summary of the JFFS2 filesystem
 Oracle E-Business Suite

Education
 Edinburgh Business School, of Heriot-Watt University
 El Nasr Boys' School, Alexandria, Egypt
 EBS University of Business and Law, in Wiesbaden, Germany
 Estonian Business School, in Tallinn, Estonia
 European Business School (disambiguation)
 East Barnet School, Academy in East Barnet, London

Finance and commerce
 E-Billing Solutions, an Indian company, now part of Ingenico
 EBS d.a.c., a financial institution in Ireland
 Electronic Broking Services, a foreign-exchange platform
 Erste Group, an Austrian financial service provider in Central and Eastern Europe

Technology
 Elastic backscattering spectrometry
 Electrical brain stimulation
 Electronic Braking System
 Ethylene bis(stearamide)

Other uses
 Ebisu Station (Tokyo), JR East station code
Egged Bus Services, an Israeli bus company operating in the Netherlands
 Elder of the Order of the Burning Spear, an honour bestowed by the President of Kenya 
 Electric Bond and Share Company, US
 Epidermolysis bullosa simplex, a disease
 Evolutionary Behavioral Sciences, a journal
 Webster City Municipal Airport, Iowa, US, IATA code
 Evidence-based scheduling